Zetela turbynei is a species of sea snail, a marine gastropod mollusk, in the family Solariellidae.

Description
The size of the shell attains 6 mm.

Distribution
This marine species occurs off the Agulhas Bank, Rep. South Africa

References

External links
 Barnard K.H. (1963). Contributions to the knowledge of South African marine Mollusca. Part IV. Gastropoda: Prosobranchiata: Rhipidoglossa, Docoglossa. Tectibranchiata. Polyplacophora. Solenogastres. Scaphopoda. Annals of the South African Museum, 47(2): 201–360
  Herbert D.G. (2015). An annotated catalogue and bibliography of the taxonomy, synonymy and distribution of the Recent Vetigastropoda of South Africa (Mollusca). Zootaxa. 4049(1): 1-98

Solariellidae